The 1965 season was the fourth season of national competitive association football in Australia and 82nd overall.

National teams

Australia national soccer team

Results and fixtures

Friendlies

1966 FIFA World Cup qualification

Cup competitions

Australia Cup

The competition began on 24 October 1965 (excluding preliminary rounds). Thirteen clubs had entered the competition with the final two clubs Sydney City and APIA Leichhardt qualifying for the Final. Hakoah won a replay match 2–1, with one goal each from David Reid and Herbert Ninaus after a 1–1 draw (13–13 on penalties)

Final

Replay

Retirements
 1 December 1965: Karl Jaros, former Austria and Australia international footballer.

References

External links
 Football Federation Australia official website

1965 in Australian soccer
Seasons in Australian soccer